Giles is a comic based on the Buffy the Vampire Slayer television series.

Plot

Having been Buffy's watcher for four years, Giles is notified by a fellow Watcher, Michaela Tomasi, of the death of his former mentor, Archie Lassiter, and returns to England. He finds out that the Watchers' Council is guarding a dark secret, which may cause the resurrection of the dark Elder Gods. Though the Council does not want his help, Giles is drawn into the attempt to prevent disaster.

Continuity

The comic is set in Buffy season 4, after "This Year's Girl" but before "Superstar". Michaela Tomasi is a character from The Gatekeeper Trilogy.

Relation to canon
Buffy comics such as this one are not usually considered by fans as canonical. Some fans consider them stories from the imaginations of authors and artists, while other fans consider them as taking place in an alternative fictional reality. However unlike fan fiction, overviews summarising their story, written early in the writing process, were approved by both Fox and Joss Whedon (or his office), and the books were therefore later published as official Buffy merchandise.

External links
 Shiai, Slayer Lit Review - "Giles: Beyond the Pale",  Slayerlit.us (2007).

Comics based on Buffy the Vampire Slayer
Dark Horse Comics one-shots